Cosmetic palettes are archaeological artifacts, originally used in predynastic Egypt to grind and apply ingredients for facial or body cosmetics. The decorative palettes of the late 4th millennium BCE appear to have lost this function and became commemorative, ornamental, and possibly ceremonial. They were made almost exclusively out of siltstone with a few exceptions. The siltstone originated from quarries in the Wadi Hammamat.

Many of the palettes were found at Hierakonpolis, a centre of power in pre-dynastic Upper Egypt.  After the unification of the country, the palettes ceased to be included in tomb assemblages.

Notable palettes

Notable decorative palettes are:
 The Cosmetic palette in the form of a Nile tortoise
 The Narmer Palette, often thought to depict the unification of Upper and Lower Egypt under the pharaoh Narmer, Egyptian Museum, Cairo
 Libyan Palette, Egyptian Museum, Cairo
 The Four Dogs Palette, displaying African wild dogs, giraffes, and other quadrupeds, Louvre
 The Battlefield Palette, British Museum and Ashmolean Museum
 The Bull Palette, at the Musée du Louvre, named for the bull at the top — obverse and reverse — trampling a man
 The Hunters Palette, British Museum and Louvre

Even undecorated palettes were often given pleasing shapes, such as the zoomorphic palettes, which included turtles and, very commonly, fish.  The fish zoomorphic palette often had an upper-centrally formed hole, presumably for suspension, and thus display.

There are also Near East stone palettes, from Canaan, Bactria, and Gandhara.

History of Egyptian palettes
Siltstone was first utilized for cosmetic palettes by the Badarian culture. The first palettes used in the Badarian Period and in Naqada I were usually plain, rhomboidal or rectangular in shape, without any further decoration. It is in the Naqada II period in which the zoomorphic palette is most common. On these examples there is more focus on symbolism and display, rather than a purely functional object for grinding pigments. The importance of symbolism eventually outweighs the functional aspect with the more elite examples found in the Naqada III period, but there is also a reversion to non-zoomorphic designs among non-elite individuals.

List of famous ancient Egyptian Predynastic palettes

Other palettes

See also
List of ancient Egyptian palettes

References

 David Wengrow, The Archaeology of Early Egypt: Social Transformations in North East Africa, Cambridge University Press 2006
 Erik Hornung, Conceptions of God in Ancient Egypt: the one and the many, Cornell University Press 1982

External links
Corpus of Egyptian Late Predynastic Palettes by Francesco Raffaele
Cosmetic Palettes, University College London

Archaeological palettes
Palette
Palette
Gerzeh culture
Naqada III
Amratian culture
Badarian culture